Turgun (fl. 515) was a military officer of Hunnish descent of the Byzantine Empire.

He was one of the officers in the army of Byzantine general Vitalian, who rebelled against Emperor Anastasius, going on two expeditions against Constantinople. His name is probably of Turkic origin. László Rásonyi took it for Turkish.

He is said to have betrayed fellow Hun commander Tarrach, handing him over to Anastasius.

References

Hun military leaders
6th-century deaths
6th-century Byzantine military personnel
Byzantine people of Hunnic descent